AZERTY is a specific layout for the characters of the Latin alphabet on typewriter keys and computer keyboards. The layout takes its name from the first six letters to appear on the first row of alphabetical keys; that is,. Similar to the QWERTZ layout, it is modelled on the English QWERTY layout. It is used in France and Belgium, although each of these countries has its own national variation on the layout. Luxembourg and Switzerland use the Swiss QWERTZ keyboard. Most of the residents of Quebec, the mainly French-speaking province of Canada, use a QWERTY keyboard that has been adapted to the French language such as the Multilingual Standard keyboard CAN/CSA Z243.200-92 which is stipulated by the government of Quebec and the Government of Canada.

The competing layouts devised for French (e.g., the ZHJAY layout put forward in 1907, Claude Marsan's 1976 layout, the 2002 Dvorak-fr, and the 2005 BÉPO layout) have obtained only limited recognition, although the latter has been included in the 2019 French keyboard layout standard.

History 

The AZERTY layout appeared in France in the last decade of the 19th century as a variation on American QWERTY typewriters.  Its exact origin is unknown. At the start of the 20th century, the French ZHJAY layout, created by Albert Navarre, failed to break into the market partly because secretaries were already accustomed to the AZERTY layout and partly because it differed more from the QWERTY layout than does the AZERTY layout.

In France, the AZERTY layout is the de facto norm for keyboards. In 1976, a QWERTY layout adapted to the French language was put forward, as an experimental standard (NF XP E55-060) by AFNOR. This standard made provision for a temporary adaptation period during which the letters A, Q, Z and W could be positioned as in the traditional AZERTY layout.

In January 2016, the French Culture Ministry has looked to replace the industrial AZERTY layouts with one that will allow a better typing of French and other languages. A standard was published by the French national organization for standardization in 2019.

The AZERTY layout is used on Belgian keyboards, although some non-alphabetic symbols are positioned differently.

General information regarding AZERTY keyboards 

There are two key details:
 the Alt Gr key allows the user to type the character shown at the bottom right of any key with three characters.
 the Alt key is used as a shortcut to commands affecting windows, and is also used in conjunction with ASCII codes for typing special characters.

Dead keys 
A dead key serves to modify the appearance of the next character to be typed on the keyboard. Dead keys are mainly used to generate accents (or diacritics) on vowels.

Circumflex accent 
For example, pressing  then  produces â.

Diaeresis 
A diaresis can be generated by striking the  key (in most AZERTY layouts, it is generated by combining the  keys), then the vowel requiring the accent. For example, pressing   then  produces ä.

Grave accent 
The grave accent can be generated by striking the  key (in the French AZERTY layout it is located to the right of the  key) on Macintosh keyboards, while on PC-type keyboards it can be generated by using the combination .

In the Belgian AZERTY layout, the grave accent is generated by the combination  (the  key is located to the right of the  key on Belgian AZERTY keyboards), and then the key for the vowel requiring the accent.

Note that the grave-accented letters à, è, and ù (as well as the acute-accented é), which are part of French orthography, have their own separate keys. Dead-grave and dead-acute (and dead-tilde) would mostly be reserved to "foreign" letters such as Italian ò, Spanish á, í, ó, ú, and ñ, Portuguese ã and õ, etc., or for accented capital letters (which are not present precomposed in the layout).

Acute accent 
The é combination can be generated using its own key. For Linux users, it can be generated using  then the vowel.

The acute accent is not available in the French layout on Windows.

Tilde 
The tilde is available under Windows by using a combination of the  keys, followed by the letter requiring the tilde.

On Macs, the ñ can be obtained by the combination of  keys, followed by the  key.

Alt key 

With some operating systems, the Alt key generates characters by means of their individual codes.  In order to obtain characters, the Alt key must be pressed and held down while typing the relevant code into the numeric keypad.

On Linux, the alt key gives direct access to French language special characters. The ligatures œ and æ can be keyed in by using either  or  respectively, in the fr-oss keyboard layout; their upper case equivalents can be generated using the same key combinations plus the  Shift key.  Other useful punctuation symbols, such as ≤, ≥, or ≠ can be more easily accessed in the same way.

Guillemets « and » 

Also called angle quotes, French quotation marks, double chevrons are polylines pointed like arrows (« or »), sometimes forming a complementary set of punctuation marks used as a form of quotation mark.

With a US International Keyboard and corresponding layout,  and  can also be used. The characters are standard on French Canadian keyboards and some others.

(This applies to all English-language keyboard layouts supplied with the operating system, e.g. "Australian", "British", "Canadian", "Irish", "Irish Extended", "U.S." and "U.S. Extended". Other language layouts may differ.) In French-language keyboard layouts  and  can be used. On Nordic keyboards,  can be used for «, and  can be used for ».

For users of Unix-like operating systems running the X Window System, creation of the guillemet depends on a number of factors including the keyboard layout that is in effect.

In Microsoft Office applications, typing the US quotation mark (on the  key) will produce either a left Guillemet « or right Guillemet » based on the spacing.

In France

AZERTY under Linux 
In X11, the window system common to many flavors of UNIX, the keyboard interface is completely configurable allowing each user to assign different functions to each key in line with their personal preferences. For example, specific combinations of  key could be assigned to many other characters.

Layout of the French keyboard under Microsoft Windows

Missing elements 
 Ever since the AZERTY keyboard was devised, a single key has been dedicated to the letter ù, which occurs in only one word (où [where]); the œ is completely unrepresented, despite the fact that it is an integral part of the French spelling system and occurs in several common words like œil (eye) and œuvre (work).
 æ, as in Lætitia [girl's name] or ex æquo [dead-heat] is also not represented.
 The non-breaking space, which prevents having punctuation characters in isolation at the ends or beginnings of lines, has no keyboard equivalent.
 The capital letters, É, Ç, and Œ (as in the word Œdipe [Oedipus], for example), are available neither on the typewriter itself, nor using the operating system mentioned earlier.

It is possible to fill in these gaps by installing a keyboard driver that has been specially enriched for the French language.

Some word-processing software packages sometimes address some of these gaps. The non-breaking space can be obtained by pressing  followed by a space, in a word-processing package such as OpenOffice.org Writer, or by using  [Spacebar] in Microsoft Word.

Apart from these gaps, the French AZERTY layout has some strange features which are still present in the Microsoft Windows Vista operating system:
 The combination  does not generate any character at all.
 When a ¦ is required, a | is generated. (However, this is a common situation for many keyboards, not just AZERTY. The main issue for keyboard makers is that a solid vertical | keycap legend could be confused with a Capital letter I and so a broken vertical ¦ keycap helps clarify that it is not a letter but a symbol. In practice, most typists actually need the solid vertical rather than a broken vertical, so using a broken vertical keycap usually doesn't cause problems.)
 Typing a period or numerals requires pressing Shift, whereas some rarer characters (ù, the semicolon) do not. This has led to drives to reform the AZERTY keyboard (chiefly by doing away with the ù, which may be typed using AltGr+è and u anyway, and/or swapping the period and semicolon), although to date this has not been successful.

Industrial layouts and French standard 

In January 2016, the French Ministry of Culture, which is in charge of language affairs, expressed a will to offer an alternative to the AZERTY layouts traditionally proposed by the industry. The new layout would have to provide full coverage of the symbols required by French spelling (including accented capitals such as É) as well as other languages of France and European languages written with the Latin alphabet. The project, led by the French national organization for standardization AFNOR, released both this improved AZERTY and a BÉPO layout. Initially due in January 2018, the standard was released in April 2019.

The layout keeps the same placement for the 26 Latin letters and 10 digits, but moves others (such as some accented letters and punctuation signs), while it adds a range of other symbols (accessible with Shift, AltGr). There is easy access to guillemets « » (French quotes), accented capital letters: À, É, Ç, as well as Œ/œ, Æ/æ, which was not possible before on basic AZERTY (Windows' AZERTY), previously alt codes were required.

It allows typing words in many languages using dead keys, which are in blue on the picture, to access a variety of diacritics. A few mathematics symbols have also been added.

A website for the new AZERTY layout has been created, offering information, visuals of the changes, links to drivers to install the layout and various other resources.

Differences between the Belgian and French layouts of the AZERTY keyboard 

The Belgian AZERTY keyboard allows for the placing of accents on vowels without recourse to encoding via the Alt key + code.

To recap the list of different keys from left to right and from top to bottom:
 First row (symbols and numbers):
 By combining the shift and ² keys, ³ is obtained;
 The symbol |, is generated by a combination of  same key as the 1;
 The @ symbol is generated by a combination of  same key as the 2;
 Unlike the French layout, the ' key (or 4 key) does not contain a third symbol. On Linux it's 1⁄4;
 Unlike the French layout, the ( key (or 5 key) does not contain a third symbol. On Linux it's ½;
 The ^ symbol is generated by a combination of  same key as the 6; but, as opposed to the ^ symbol found to the right of the p key, it is not a dead key, and therefore does not generate the placing of a circumflex accent;
 Unlike the French layout, the è (or 7) key does not contain a third symbol. On Linux it's {;
 Unlike the French layout, the ! (or 8) key does not contain a third symbol. On Linux it's [;
 The { symbol is obtained by a combination of  same key as the 9;
 The } symbol is obtained by a combination of  same key as the 0;
 Unlike the French layout, the ) (or °) key does not contain a third symbol. On Linux it's \;
 The key to the right of the  key contains the following symbols: - _ with shift and, unlike the French layout, does not contain a third symbol. On Linux it's the dead key ¸.
 Second row (the letters AZERTYuiop):
 the alphabetical keys do not have Alt Gr codes apart from the e, which generates the euro symbol, €;
 The [ symbol is obtained by a combination of  same key as the ¨ (a partially dead key located to the right of the p key);
 the key to the right of the ^ key contains the following symbols: $ * with shift and ] with Alt Gr;
 Third row (the letters qsdfghjklm)
 the key to the right of m contains the following symbols: ù % with shift and the partially dead key ´ with Alt Gr, which allows acute accents to be generated on accented vowels;
 the key to the right of ù contains the following symbols: μ £ with shift and the partially dead key ` with Alt Gr, which allows grave accents to be generated on accented vowels;
 Fourth row (the letters wxcvbn and basic punctuation):
 the key to the right of : contains the following symbols: = + with shift and the partially dead key ~ with Alt Gr, the latter either generating the tilde symbol when combined with the space bar, or positioning a tilde over a letter: a → ã, A → Ã, n → ñ, N → Ñ, o → õ, O → Õ.

The description partially dead means that pressing the key in question sometimes generates the desired symbol directly, but that at least one of the symbols represented on the key will only appear after a second key has been pressed.  In order to obtain a symbol in isolation, the space bar must be pressed, otherwise a vowel should be pressed to generate the required accented form.

The other keys are identical, even though traditionally the names of special keys are printed on them in English. This is because Belgium is predominantly bilingual (French-Dutch) and officially trilingual (a third language, German, is spoken in the East Cantons).

The key to the right of 0 on the numeric keypad corresponds either to the full stop or to the comma (which is why there are two distinct keyboard drivers under Windows).

The AZERTY keyboard as used in the Dutch speaking part of Belgium uses the name shift instead of maj and caps lock instead of verr maj.

Variants 
The AZERTY layout is used in France, Belgium and some African countries. It differs from the QWERTY layout thus:
 The digits 0 to 9 are on the same keys, but to be typed the shift key must be pressed. The unshifted positions are used for accented characters,
 Caps lock is replaced by Shift lock, thus affecting non-letter keys as well. However, there is an ongoing evolution towards a Caps lock key instead of a Shift lock.

The French and Belgian AZERTY keyboards also have special characters used in the French and Dutch language, such as é, è, ê, ï, ë, ... and other characters such as &, ", ', and ç (only for French), some located under the numbers and some with combinations of keys.

French 

Some French people use the Canadian Multilingual standard keyboard.

The Portuguese (Portugal) keyboard layout may also be preferred, as it provides all the French diacritics (acute, grave, diaeresis, circumflex, cedilla, including on capital letters that are not all possible with an industrial French layouts, and also the French quotation marks or guillemets, «»). Furthermore, its dead-letter option for all the diacritical keys allows for easy input of all the possibilities in French and many other languages (áàäãâéèëêíìïîñóòöõôúùüû). 'ç' is, however, a separate key (but only as a lowercase letter in the basic French standard layout).

The US-International keyboard may also used for the same reason (notably by programmers as it allows easier input of ASCII characters, provided that they are trained to a QWERTY layout rather than the most common AZERTY layouts available in most computer shops, including online). An alternative (extremely rarely found) to AZERTY is the Bépo layout : it's not available on any notebook, but may be used by adding an external keyboard, bought separately from some specialized shops.

.

Apple 

Apple's keyboards use the same AZERTY layout in both France and Belgium. Based on the Belgian version, the most notable differences are the locations for the @-sign and €-sign, among others. MacOS also supports the standard French layout for non-Apple keyboards; the standard Belgian layout, however, is available through third-party support only.

Arabic 

There is an Arabic variant of the AZERTY keyboard. It is especially used in the African countries Algeria, Chad, Comoros, Djibouti, Mauritania, Morocco, Tunisia and in Arab communities in French-speaking countries to be able to type both in Arabic and in French.

Tamazight (Berber) 

The Tamazight (Latin) standards-compliant layout is optimised for a wide range of Tamazight (Berber) language variants – including Tuareg variants – rather than French, though French can still be typed quickly. It installs as "Tamazight_L" and can be used both on the French locale and with Tamazight locales.

QWERTY and QWERTZ adaptations of the layout are available for the physical keyboards used by major Amazigh (Berber) communities around the world.

Other layouts exist for closer backwards compatibility with the French layout. They are non-standards-compliant but convenient, allowing typing in Tifinagh script without switching layout:
 Tamazight (International) extends the French layout with Tamazight (Berber), and offers secondary Tifinagh script access by deadkey. It installs as "Tamazight (Agraghlan)" or "Français+" and is available from the official site of the Algerian High Council for Amazighity (HCA).
 Tamazight (International)+ is optimised for Tamazight (Berber), but retains close French compatibility and provides easy typing in Tifinagh script by Caps Lock. It installs as "Tamazight (Agraghlan)+" or "Tamazight_LF".

All the above layouts were designed by the Universal Amazigh Keyboard Project and are available from there.

Vietnamese 

There is also a Vietnamese variant of the AZERTY keyboard. It was especially used in Vietnamese typewriters made until 1980s.

Wolof 
Wolof keyboards also use AZERTY and are supported by Microsoft Windows (Windows 7 and later only).

See also 
 Dvorak layout
 Layout of keys on computer keyboards
 QWERTY
 QWERTZ

References

External links 

 The typewriter on the site of the National Archives
 Accentuate the capital letters 
 The page on the Microsoft keyboard layouts / keyboard layouts

Latin-script keyboard layouts